Planet of the Apes: The Documentary is a DVD by Guano Apes released in 2005 through BMG.

Description
The DVD's research, conception, direction, editing, and design were constructed by Friedel Muders, and it was distributed by BMG Ariola München. Its running time is approximately four hours and two minutes long and in German, formatted with English subtitles.

Release
This Guano Apes DVD was released on 7 February 2005.

DVD contents
 Main-Menü
 THE MOVIE/documentary (c. 67 min.)
 ME & ME (c. 25 min.) Single portraits
 Live / Portugal (c. 60 min.)
 Clips (c. 50 min.)
 The Fanbase (c. 22 min.) mit Demosoundtrack (remastered)
 Live-Menü | SUDOESTE Portugal-Gig from 6.8.2000
 No Speech
 Gogan
 Rain
 Living in a Lie
 Heaven
 Move a Little Closer
 We Use the Pain
 Ain't Got Time
 I Want It
 Big in Japan
 Wash It Down
 Dödel Up
 Living in a Lie – recording
 Lords of the boards
 Clip-Menü
 You Can't Stop Me
 Pretty in Scarlet
 Quietly
 Break the Line
 Sing That Song
 Dödel Up
 Making Of...
 You Can't Stop Me
 Pretty in Scarlet
 Quietly
 Fanbase
 Wasserfliege – unreleased
 Get Busy – demo version
 Rain – demo version
 Ignatz – Suzie demo version
 Score – unreleased
 Tribute – demo version
 3°under (Instrumental) – unreleased

BONUS: Multimedia-Part for PC & MAC

Notes

2005 films
Guano Apes
Rockumentaries